Jon Pacheco Dozagarat (born 8 January 2001) is a Spanish professional footballer who plays as a central defender for Real Sociedad.

Club career
Born in Elizondo, Navarre, Pacheco joined Real Sociedad's youth setup in 2013, aged 12, from CD Baztán KE. He made his senior debut with the C-team on 8 December 2018, coming on as a half-time substitute in a 0–0 Tercera División away draw against CD Basconia.

Pacheco was promoted to the reserves in Segunda División B ahead of the 2019–20 campaign, and signed a contract until 2025 on 30 August 2019. He made his first team – and La Liga – debut on 29 June of the following year, starting in a 2–1 away loss against Getafe CF.

Ahead of the 2021–22 season, Real Sociedad director of football Roberto Olabe announced that Pacheco and Sanse teammate Robert Navarro were promoted to the main squad.

International career
Pacheco represented Spain at under-16, under-17, under-18 and under-19 levels, playing in the 2018 UEFA European Under-17 Championship.

References

External links
 
 
 

1999 births
Living people
People from Baztán (comarca)
Spanish footballers
Footballers from Navarre
Association football defenders
La Liga players
Segunda División players
Segunda División B players
Tercera División players
Real Sociedad C footballers
Real Sociedad B footballers
Real Sociedad footballers
Spain youth international footballers
Spain under-21 international footballers